Helvio Soto (1930–2001) was a Chilean filmmaker.

Select filmography
 Caliche sangriento (1969)
 Voto + fusil (1971)
 Il pleut sur Santiago (1975)

References

External links

1930 births
2001 deaths
Chilean film directors